Superhero: 2044 is a role-playing game first published by its designer Donald Saxman in 1977 and republished by Lou Zocchi later that year.

Description

Superhero: 2044 is a superhero science fiction system set in 2044, with background material on the future world and rules for character creation, combat, movement and scenario design. The second edition of the game includes rules for solo play.

The game takes place in the year 2044 after a global holocaust, on Inguria, an island off America's west coast, which has become an important center of civilization. The game includes maps of the island and its city. Due to radiation exposure, certain humans gained superhuman powers. The three basic types of ability are the "ubermensch", who specializes in physical abilities of combat; the "unique", who possess the extraordinary ability of a beneficial mutation; and the "toolmaster", who is an expert technologist.

Characters 

Player characters are designed using 140 basic points divided between seven characteristics: vigor, stamina, charisma, endurance, mentality, ego and dexterity. These scores are adjusted according to character type and a personal bonus applied to the character's specialization.

Gameplay 

Play involves two parts: face-to-face scenarios and the rest of the week's activities. The scenarios give scores for such areas as crime prevention, location, getting leads, convictions and avoiding unnecessary damage to people and buildings. In the other part of play, each character fills out a weekly planning sheet indicating when he is patrolling, resting, training or researching.

Publication history

Superhero: 2044 was designed and published by Donald Saxman in 1977, with art by Mick Cagle, as a 32-page book with a black and white cover. A second edition was published the same year by Lou Zocchi as a ring-bound 50-page book, with a color cover.

Superhero 2044 is the earliest example of a professionally produced superhero role-playing game. Judges Guild published Hazard, the game's only published adventure.

Reception
Eamon Bloomfield reviewed Superhero: 2044 for White Dwarf #9 (Oct/Nov 1978), giving it an overall score of 6 out of 10, and concludes his review by stating, "The rules are well worked out and cover most eventualities with clear examples. On the other hand this is not a game for maths and table-shy GMs as everything is down to modified probabilities with the usual resultant working out to do. As with most such games setting up requires some time but at least here the world is already designed. Overall good fun and realistic and a welcome addition to any role playing fan's collection. Certainly as a postal game it has a great future. It might even convert quite readily to a computer based programme in a similar way to 'Starweb'."

In his 1991 book Heroic Worlds: A History and Guide to Role-Playing Games, Lawrence Schick described the game as "Ground-breaking", although he called the rules "primitive".

In the 1980 book The Complete Book of Wargames, game designer Jon Freeman was disappointed in this game calling it "neither as plausible as En Garde! nor as exciting as Dungeons & Dragons." He further noted that "While the rules are quite detailed in many respects, they are not particularly clear or well organized. In fact, except for some marvelous illustrations, the whole thing is rather sloppily put together."  Freeman gave this game an Overall Evaluation of "Fair", concluding, "It's unique, though, and comics fanatics who are already knowledgeable role-playing gamers could have fun with it."

References

Role-playing games introduced in 1977
Science fiction role-playing games
Superhero role-playing games